Hank Williams Jr. Fourteen Greatest Hits is an album by American singer and songwriter Hank Williams Jr. The album was issued by Polydor Records as number MG-1-5020.

Track listing

Side one
 Eleven Roses
 Cajun Baby
 All For the Love of Sunshine
 Hank
 Rainin' in My Heart (James Moore/Jerry West)
 Rainy Night in Georgia
 It's All Over but the Crying

Side two
 The Last Love Song
 I'd Rather Be Gone
 I'll Think of Something
 Pride's Not Hard to Swallow
 Ain't That a Shame (Sung with the Mike Curb Congregation)
 I've Got a Right to Cry
 Standing in the Shadows

External links
 Hank Williams Jr's Official Website

1976 greatest hits albums
Hank Williams Jr. compilation albums
Polydor Records compilation albums